Fug or FUG may refer to:

 D-442 FÚG, a Hungarian armoured car
 Fuyang Xiguan Airport, China
 Gaúcho United Front, a defunct political party of Brazil
 Fug, a minced oath in Norman Mailer's novel The Naked and the Dead
  (FuG), Luftwaffe radio equipment (Funkgerät) of World War II

People with the surname
 François Fug (born 1931), Luxembourgian former sports shooter

See also 
 The Fugs, an American band